Elena Aleksandrovna Naryshkina, Serene Princess of Italy, Countess Suvorov-Rymniksky (1785 - December 3, 1855 ) was a Russian noblewoman and maid of honour.

Family
She was a daughter of chancellor A L Naryshkin, granddaughter of admiral Alexei Senyavin, sister of Lev Alexandrovitch Narychkine and K A Narychkine, daughter-in-law of Alexander Suvorov (via her first marriage, to his son Arkadi Suvorov) and cousin of Count Mikhail Semyonovich Vorontsov.

Children
Maria
Barbara
Alexander
Constantine

1785 births
1855 deaths
Countesses of the Russian Empire
Elena
Suvorov family
19th-century people from the Russian Empire